Elena Fabrizi (born Elena Fabbrizi; 17 June 1915 – 9 August 1993), popularly known as sora Lella ("Mrs. Lella" in Romanesco), was an Italian stage, television and film actress, and a television personality.

Life and career 
Born in Rome, the younger sister of the actor and director Aldo, in the late 1950s Fabrizi started occasionally appearing in films, considering the acting career just a hobby, being her true profession the restaurateur and gastronome. Mainly used for very little character roles, her acting career had her peak in early 1980s, thanks to a series of films directed by Carlo Verdone in which she played the typical role of the good-natured, grumbling grandmother. For her role in Bianco, rosso e Verdone Fabrizi won a Silver Ribbon for Best New Actress, while in 1984 she won a David di Donatello for Best Supporting Actress for her performance in Acqua e sapone.

Fabrizi was also a busy television personality, and for a long time she was a regular guest on the television program Maurizio Costanzo Show. She suffered from diabetes, and died of a stroke at Fatebenefratelli Hospital in Rome. She was a supporter of S.S. Lazio.

References

External links 

Actresses from Rome
Italian stage actresses
Italian television actresses
Italian film actresses
1915 births
1993 deaths
20th-century Italian actresses
Nastro d'Argento winners
David di Donatello winners
Burials at the Cimitero Flaminio
Italian gastronomes